Jonathan Gabriel Torres (born 29 December 1996) is an Argentine professional footballer who plays as a forward for Liga MX club Querétaro, on loan from Sarmiento.

Career
Quilmes were Torres' first senior club, he started playing professionally for them in 2015 when he made his debut against Rosario Central in the Argentine Primera División on 17 August; he had previously been an unused substitute in a Copa Argentina tie with Independiente Rivadavia and a league match with Tigre in the month prior. He scored his first senior goal in February 2018, netting in a 3–0 Primera B Nacional win over Brown. Overall, he scored two goals in twenty-three appearances for Quilmes. On 7 August 2018, Torres joined fellow Primera B Nacional side Almagro.

In October 2020, Torres moved to Sarmiento.

Career statistics
.

References

External links

1996 births
Living people
Footballers from Santa Fe, Argentina
Argentine footballers
Association football forwards
Argentine Primera División players
Primera Nacional players
Quilmes Atlético Club footballers
Club Almagro players
Club Atlético Sarmiento footballers